Kaljo Pork  (March 30, 1930 - December 2, 1981) was an Estonian botanist. He was affiliated with the Estonian Institute of Zoology and Botany between 1952 and his death in 1981.

Pork was born in the village of Ramma in Järva County. He initiated the creation of Laelatu Biological Station at one of the most species-rich plant community in Europe — a wooded meadow at the western coast of Estonia.

He died in Tartu.

References

1930 births
1981 deaths
People from Järva Parish
20th-century Estonian botanists